Highs in the Mid-Sixties, Volume 17 (subtitled Texas, Part 4) is a compilation album in the Highs in the Mid-Sixties series, featuring recordings that were released in Texas. This is one of five volumes in the series that collects songs by Texas bands; the others are Highs in the Mid-Sixties, Volume 11, Highs in the Mid-Sixties, Volume 12, Highs in the Mid-Sixties, Volume 13, and Highs in the Mid-Sixties, Volume 23.

Release data
This album was released in 1985 as an LP by AIP Records (as #AIP-10026).

Notes on the tracks
"We Sell Soul" by the Spades was a regional hit by one of the first bands headed by Roky Erickson; he was one of the founding members of the legendary psychedelic rock band 13th Floor Elevators. Houston's Neil Ford – also spelled Neal Ford – was in a succession of bands including the Ramadas. Their "Shame on You" was included on Essential Pebbles, Volume 2. These Iguanas are not the same band that launched Iggy Pop's career, although a track by those Iguanas is included on Highs in the Mid-Sixties, Volume 19.
The track listed as "The Darkest Hour (Part 1)" is actually the instrumental B-side, Part 2.

Track listing

Side 1

 The Sparkles: "The U. T." (The Sparkles)
 S. J. & the Crossroads: "Ooh Poo Pah Doo" (Jessie Hill)
 S. J. & the Crossroads: "The Darkest Hour (Part 1)" (J. Sergio/S. Messina)
 The Souncations: "Exit" (Jerry Rojas)
 The Visions: "Humpty Dumpty" (The Visions)
 The Spectrum: "Bald Headed Woman" (Talmy)
 The Gentle'men: "Come On (If You Can)" (B. Russo/E. Hackett) — rel. 1966

Side 2
 Kempy & the Guardians: "Love for a Price" (Pat Davidson)
 The Roks: "Hey Joe" (Billy Roberts)
 Lost Generation: "They Tell Me" (Rhodes)
 The Spades: "We Sell Soul" (Emil Schwartze)
 Neal Ford and the Fanatics: "Bitter Bells" (Neil Ford/Stringfellow)
 The Iguanas: "I'm Leaving You Baby" (Alan Melinger)

Pebbles (series) albums
1985 compilation albums
Music of Texas